Ciarán Joyce (born 2002) is an Irish hurler who plays for Cork Intermediate Championship club Castlemartyr, divisional side Imokilly and at inter-county level with the Cork senior hurling team. He usually lines out as a centre-back.

Career

Joyce first came to hurling prominence as a schoolboy with Midleton CBS Secondary School with whom he won a Harty Cup title in 2019. He quickly progressed onto the Castlemartyr club team and won back-to-back intermediate titles in two different grades in 2020 and 2021. By this stage Joyce had made an impression at inter-county level as a member of the Cork minor hurling team during the 2019 Munster Minor Championship. He later won consecutive All-Ireland Under-20 Championship titles with the under-20 team. Joyce's performances in this grade earned a call-up to the senior team training panel in December 2021.

Career statistics

Honours

Midleton CBS
Harty Cup: 2019

Castlemartyr
Cork Intermediate A Hurling Championship: 2021
Cork Lower Intermediate Hurling Championship: 2020

Cork
All-Ireland Under-20 Hurling Championship: 2020, 2021
Munster Under-20 Hurling Championship: 2020, 2021

References

2002 births
Living people
Castlemartyr hurlers
Imokilly hurlers
Cork inter-county hurlers